The Dutch–Venezuelan crisis of 1908 was a dispute that broke out between the Netherlands and Venezuela after the Venezuelan president, Cipriano Castro, cut off trade with the Dutch island of Curaçao.

The Dutch warships had orders to intercept every ship that was sailing under the Venezuelan flag. On 12 December, Gelderland captured the Venezuelan coast guard ship Alix (Alejo in spanish) off Puerto Cabello. She and another ship, 23 de Mayo, were interned in harbor of Willemstad. With their overwhelming naval superiority, the Dutch enforced a blockade on Venezuela's ports. 

A few days later, on 19 December 1908, Vice President Juan Vicente Gómez seized power in Caracas during the absence of President Castro, who had left for Berlin for a surgical operation, installing himself as de facto president. Gómez reverted Castro's measures in the following days, and the Netherlands proceeded to withdraw its warships.

Footnotes 

1908 in international relations
1908 in the Netherlands
1908 in Venezuela
Maritime incidents in 1908
Maritime incidents in Venezuela
Military operations involving the Netherlands
Military operations involving Venezuela
Netherlands–Venezuela relations